Zonitis is a genus of blister beetles in the family Meloidae. The genus was named and described by Johan Christian Fabricius in 1775.

Species
According to EOL, GBIF, and Catalogue of Life.

 Zonitis abdominalis Laporte, 1840
 Zonitis abyssinica Fairmaire, 1882 - Abyssinian blister beetle
 Zonitis afghanica Kaszab, 1958 - Afghan blister beetle
 Zonitis andersoni Blackburn, 1889
 Zonitis angulata Fabricius, 1787
 Zonitis annulata MacLeay, 1872
 Zonitis apicalis MacLeay, 1872 - Bee-like blister beetle
 Zonitis aspericeps Blackburn, 1899
 Zonitis atriceps Fauvel, 1905
 Zonitis atripennis (Say, 1823)
 Zonitis atripes Wellman, 1910
 Zonitis aurea MacSwain, 1951
 Zonitis ballionis Escherich, 1892
 Zonitis batjanensis Pic, 1911
 Zonitis bellieri Reiche, 1860
 Zonitis bilineata Say, 1817
 Zonitis bipartita Fairmaire, 1879
 Zonitis bizonata MacLeay, 1872
 Zonitis bomiensis Tan, 1988
 Zonitis brevicornis Blackburn, 1889
 Zonitis bytinskii Kaszab, 1957
 Zonitis californica Wickham, 1905 - California blister beetle
 Zonitis chrysomeloides (Linnaeus, 1763)
 Zonitis costatipennis Pic, 1909
 Zonitis cothurnata Marseul, 1873
 Zonitis cowleyi Blackburn, 1889 - Cowley's blister beetle
 Zonitis cribricollis (LeConte, 1853)
 Zonitis cyanipennis Pascoe, 1862
 Zonitis cylindracea Fairmaire, 1880
 Zonitis dichroa Germar, 1848
 Zonitis dolichocera Wellman, 1910
 Zonitis downesi Pascoe, 1862 - Downes' blister beetle
 Zonitis dunniana Casey, 1891
 Zonitis erythrothorax Wellman, 1910
 Zonitis escherichi Semenov, 1893
 Zonitis ferganensis Pic, 1951 - Fergan blister beetle
 Zonitis fernancastroi Pardo Alcaide, 1950
 Zonitis flava Fabricius, 1775
 Zonitis flaviceps Waterhouse, 1875
 Zonitis flavicollis Dugès, 1881
 Zonitis flavicrus Fairmaire, 1879
 Zonitis flavida LeConte, 1853
 Zonitis flavipennis Péringuey, 1888
 Zonitis flohri Dugès, 1889 - Flohr's blister beetle
 Zonitis fogoensis Kaszab & Geisthardt, 1985 - Fogo/Cape Verdean blister beetle
 Zonitis fortuccii Fairmaire, 1887
 Zonitis fulviventris Beauregard, 1890
 Zonitis fuscicornis MacLeay, 1872
 Zonitis fuscimembris Fairmaire, 1886
 Zonitis genicularis Wellman, 1910
 Zonitis geniculata Fairmaire, 1887
 Zonitis glasunowi Semenov, 1893
 Zonitis gloriosa Blackburn, 1889
 Zonitis guerini Montrouz, 1860
 Zonitis hauseri Escherich, 1897
 Zonitis helmsi Blackburn, 1896 - Helms' blister beetle
 Zonitis henoni Fairmaire, 1893
 Zonitis hesperis Selander, 1952
 Zonitis holoxantha Fairmaire, 1887
 Zonitis immaculata (A. G. Olivier, 1789)
 Zonitis indigacea Fairmaire, 1880
 Zonitis interpretis Enns, 1956
 Zonitis iphigeniae Pliginskij, 1914
 Zonitis janthinipennis Fairmaire, 1880
 Zonitis japonicus Pic, 1910
 Zonitis javana Pic, 1911 - Java blister beetle
 Zonitis kozlowi Semenov, 1900
 Zonitis lateritia Champion, 1892
 Zonitis latreillei Laporte, 1840
 Zonitis limbipennis Fairmaire, 1880
 Zonitis longipalpis Blackburn, 1899
 Zonitis lutea MacLeay, 1872
 Zonitis macroxantha Fairmaire, 1887 
 Zonitis marani Kaszab, 1965
 Zonitis marginiventris Fairmaire, 1887
 Zonitis melanarthra Fairmaire, 1894
 Zonitis melanocephala Tauscher, 1812
 Zonitis melanoptera Wellman, 1910
 Zonitis microcephala Escherich, 1897
 Zonitis minutissima Pinto, 2001
 Zonitis mitshkei Pic, 1911
 Zonitis miwai Kono, 1936
 Zonitis murrayi Blackburn, 1889 - Murray's blister beetle
 Zonitis nana Ragusa, 1881
 Zonitis natala Beauregard, 1890
 Zonitis neoguineensis Pic, 1911 - New Guinean (or Papuan) blister beetle
 Zonitis nigripectus Fairmaire, 1891
 Zonitis nigripennis Fauvel, 1905
 Zonitis nigritarsis (Stierlin, 1876)
 Zonitis nigriventris Motschulsky, 1872
 Zonitis nigroaenea Fairmaire, 1879
 Zonitis nigroapicata Fairmaire, 1880
 Zonitis nigromaculata Dugès, 1889
 Zonitis nigroplagiata Fairmaire, 1880
 Zonitis novercalis Escherich, 1891
 Zonitis obscuripes Fairmaire, 1879
 Zonitis opacorufa Fairmaire, 1880
 Zonitis pallicolor Fairmaire, 1880
 Zonitis pallidula Wellman, 1910
 Zonitis perforata Casey, 1891
 Zonitis ploribunda Wellman, 1910
 Zonitis posticalis Fairmaire, 1879
 Zonitis propinqua MacSwain, 1951
 Zonitis pseudopraeusta Kaszab, 1958
 Zonitis pulcherrima Pic, 1910
 Zonitis punctipennis (LeConte, 1880)
 Zonitis purpureipennis Waterhouse, 1875
 Zonitis queenslandica Blackburn, 1899 - Queensland (or Queenslandic) blister beetle
 Zonitis rostrata Blessig, 1861
 Zonitis ruficollis Frivaldszky, 1877
 Zonitis rugata Fairmaire, 1880
 Zonitis rugosipennis Fairmaire, 1879
 Zonitis rustica Blackburn, 1889
 Zonitis sayi Wickham, 1905
 Zonitis scutellaris Fairmaire, 1892
 Zonitis sedilloti Fairmaire, 1880
 Zonitis seminigra Fairmaire, 1879
 Zonitis semirubra Pic, 1911
 Zonitis semirufa Fairmaire, 1880
 Zonitis sexmaculata Ménétriés, 1832
 Zonitis sikkimensis Pic, 1910
 Zonitis sinensis Pic, 1935
 Zonitis splendida Fairmaire, 1879
 Zonitis stevewardi Pinto, 2001 - Steve Ward's blister beetle
 Zonitis straminea Fairmaire, 1894
 Zonitis strigata Wellman, 1910
 Zonitis subrugata Blackburn, 1899
 Zonitis sulcicollis Blatchley, 1910
 Zonitis superba Pic, 1910
 Zonitis surinamensis Pic, 1910 - Surinamese blister beetle
 Zonitis tarasca (Dugès, 1888)
 Zonitis tenebrosa Champion, 1892
 Zonitis tenuemarginata Fairmaire, 1887
 Zonitis tenuicornis Fairmaire, 1880
 Zonitis tricolor Le Guillou, 1844 - Three colored blister beetle
 Zonitis turkestanica Semenov, 1900 - Turkestani blister beetle
 Zonitis ventralis Fairmaire, 1880
 Zonitis vermiculata Schaeffer, 1905
 Zonitis violaceipennis Waterhouse, 1875
 Zonitis vittigera (LeConte, 1853)
 Zonitis xanthochroa Wellman, 1910
 Zonitis yorkensis Blackburn, 1899

References

External links

 
 

Meloidae